The Seven Gates of Hell is a modern urban legend regarding locations in York County, Pennsylvania. Two versions of the legend exist, one involving a burnt insane asylum and the other an eccentric doctor. Both agree that there are seven gates in a wooded area of Hellam Township, Pennsylvania, and that anyone who passes through all seven goes straight to Hell. The location in question never housed an institution; the aforementioned doctor only constructed one gate, to keep out trespassers. Despite the popularity of this as a tourist destination, the property is privately held; visitors may be charged with trespassing as a result.

Myth
There are two popular versions of the myth, each with numerous variations. One states that a mental institution used to be located on either Toad Road or Trout Run Road, depending on the source, in Hellam Township, Pennsylvania. It was erected in a remote location so as to isolate people deemed insane from the rest of the world. One day in the 1900s, a fire broke out and, due to its remoteness, firefighters could not reach the hospital in time to save it. Many patients died in the flames, while others escaped and were soon beaten to death.

The gates' role in the story is disputed. Some say that the gates were put up by the local search party to trap the remaining inmates. Others say that, completely unrelated to the asylum story, an eccentric physician who lived on the property built several gates along a path deep into the forest. Both accounts agree on only one gate being visible during the day, but the other six can be seen at night. According to the legend, no one has ever passed the fifth gate, but if they passed all seven, they would go directly to Hell.

Reality

In reality, there used to be a road in Hellam Township named Toad Road, however it was wiped off the map after Hurricane Agnes in 1972. Toad Road ran along the Codorus Creek and led to the Codorus Furnace. Today, there are multiple gates on this property; which is privately owned. Trespassers can be arrested and prosecuted. The gates associated with this legend can be found alongside Range Road and end at the old intersection between Trout Run, Range and Toad Road. All can be seen day or night, contrary to what the legend says. The dense wooded area, known as Trout Run, contains the ruins of a flint mill (likely mistaken for a burnt-down asylum).

The only detail to back truth up to this myth would be the fact that Dr. Harold Belknap – a practitioner at West Side Sanitarium – lived along Toad Road. He was not eccentric, but actually kind-hearted. Belknap would often make threatening signs for any trespassers (most likely interested in the legend) with toad-related humor written on them – which was how the road got its name.  A related myth states that Hellam was named after Hell; this is untrue as well, as it is a corruption of Hallam, after Hallamshire, England.

Notoriety
The Seven Gates of Hell have received a fair amount of attention. Mike Argento wrote about it in the York Daily Record, and Matt Lake featured a section on the gates in his book, Weird Pennsylvania. Hellam Township published a page debunking the myths. Local resident Cheryl Englar reported a number of tourists searching for the gates, some harassing her and giving her cause to call the police.

In media
Toad Road, a 2012 independent psychological horror film, makes use of the legend.

References

Urban legends
York County, Pennsylvania